Statistics of Swedish football Division 3 for the 1971 season.

League standings

Norra Norrland, Övre 1971

Norra Norrland, Nedre 1971

Södra Norrland, Övre 1971

Södra Norrland, Nedre 1971

Norra Svealand 1971

Östra Svealand 1971

Västra Svealand 1971

Nordöstra Götaland 1971

Nordvästra Götaland 1971

Mellersta Götaland 1971

Sydöstra Götaland 1971

Sydvästra Götaland 1971

Skåne 1971

Footnotes

References 

Swedish Football Division 3 seasons